Devarshi Kala Nath Shastry was born on 15 July 1936. He is a Sanskrit scholar honoured by the President of India in 1988. He is an Indologist and a prolific writer of Sanskrit, Hindi and English, and a well-known linguist, who has contributed to the campaign of evolving technical terminology in Indian languages and ensuring a respectable status to Hindi, the official language of his state and the Indian union.

Academic contribution

He has continued the rich tradition of introducing modern genres and modes of expression in an ancient language like Sanskrit for which his father late Kavishiromani Bhatt Mathuranath Shastri is known in the history of modern Sanskrit literature. He has authored more than two dozen books and edited equal number of books in Sanskrit, Hindi and English and is known for his interliterary translations of monumental works of Philosophy and literature in these languages and also Prakrit, Vraj Bhasha, Rajasthani and other Indian languages.

Literary achievements

He has contributed more than a thousand articles in Hindi and Sanskrit to reputed journals of India and broadcast more than 200 talks, poems, and plays in Sanskrit, Hindi and English. He is a literary historian, critic and commentator. In the history of modern Sanskrit literature he is known as a fiction writer who has introduced a modern idiom in creative Sanskrit writing through his novels, short stories, personal essays, and his books on the 20th century Sanskrit literature. He was the chairman of the Rajasthan Sanskrit Academy (2021) and the Director of Sanskrit Education and Bhasha Vibhag (1976–1994).

Career

His career started with the pursuit of traditional Sanskrit learning, Indian Aesthetics, Comparative Linguistics, the Vedas & Shastras under the tutelage of Sanskrit scholars like his own father Bhatt Mathuranath Shastri, Giridhar Sharma Chaturvedi, Pt. Pattabhiram Shastri, Pt. Hari Shastri, and Jagdish Sharma. He mastered linguistics and aesthetics of Sanskrit, and also studied the literatures of Hindi and English.

After obtaining his post-graduation degree with 1st Division in English he taught English Language and literature at the Postgraduate colleges of the University of Rajasthan for eight years, then took over the administration of official language as Deputy Director and later as Director of Bhasha Vibhag (Directorate of Official Language) of the Government of Rajasthan from which position he retired in 1994.

He was also Director of Sanskrit Education, Government of Rajasthan (1991–1993). He served as chairman, Rajasthan Sanskrit Academy (1995–1998) and founder- Chairman of Kavishiromani Bhatt Mathuranath Shastri Sanskrit Chair at the Jagadguru Ramanandacharya Rajasthan Sanskrit University, Jaipur. He is Chairman of the Modern Sanskrit Chair at the Sanskrit University. He is also advising as permanent member of Rajasthan Government's Hindi Law Committee, and as member of Kendriya Sanskrit Board, National Book Trust and Sahitya Academy. He is associated in different capacities with dozens of governmental and non-governmental associations, institutions and organisations related with Sanskrit and Hindi. He is also the founder Chairman of "Manjunath Smriti Sansthan", located in Jaipur.

Devarshi Kala Nath Shastry worked as a member of the 2nd Sanskrit Commission of the Government of India (2014-2016).

Major honours and awards

He has been honoured by a large number of institutions, universities, organisations and governments with titles such as 'Mahamahopadhyaya' (in 2008 by Shri LBS Rashtriya Sanskrit Vidyapeeth, Deemed University, New Delhi), 'Sahitya Mahodadhi' (1993), and 'Sahitya Shiromani' (1999) and awards such as Lifetime Achievement Award for Sanskrit, Government of Rajasthan, Jaipur 2012, Lifetime Achievement Award for Sanskrit Journalism by Uttar Pradesh Sanskrit Sansthan, 2008, Award for Sanskrit by Central Sahitya Academy (2004), Honours by Ministry of Human Resources, Govt. of India (1995 and 1998).  He was recognised for his contribution to Sanskrit by none other than the President of India, Dr. K. R. Narayanan, in 1998. He was bestowed upon with "Rashtrapati Puraskar" for his contribution to Sanskrit.

Major published works 

 Works of Panditaraj Jagannath's Poetry :1987 : 134pp 22 cm 
 Aakhyanvallari (Story Collection in Sanskrit: Awarded by Sahitya Akademi, New Delhi in 2004)
 Sanskrit ke Gaurav Shikhar (Series-10), Rashtriya Sanskrit Sansthan, New Delhi, 2006
 Adhunik Kaal ka Sanskrit Gadya Sahitya (Series-17), Rashtriya Sanskrit Sansthan, New Delhi
 Jeewanasya Prishthadwayam (Novel)
 One Hundred Years of Philosophy (Translation of John Passmore's History of Modern Western Philosophy), Published by Rajasthan Hindi Granth Academy, Jaipur, 1966, 1987
 Sanskrit Sahitya ka Itihas ( History of Sanskrit Literature), 2009
 Sanskriti ke Vaataayan (Collection of Cultural Essays)
 Bhartiya Darshan ka Itihas ( Translation of Dasgupta's book in 5 volumes with Ramesh Kumar)Published by Rajasthan Hindi Granth Academy, Jaipur, 1978, 1988, 1998
 Makers of Indian Literature : Bhatt Mathuranath Shastri 'Manjunath', Central Sahitya Academy, New Delhi, 2013

 Kavitavallari (collection of poems), Jaipur, 2006
 Kathanakvalli (story collection), Jaipur, 1987
 Vidvajjanacharitamritam (biographies), New Delhi, 1982
 Vaidik Vangmaya mein Bharatiya Sanskriti, Bikaner, 2003
 Manak Hindi ka Swaroop, New Delhi, 2002 and Jaipur, 2010
 Bharatiya Sanskriti – Adhaar aur Parivesh, Jaipur, 1989
 Sahitya Chintan, Jaipur 2005
 Lalitkatha Kalpavalli, Jaipur, 2012
 Adhunik Sanskrit Sahitya:Ek Vyapak Drishtipaat, Allahabad, 2001
 Bhartiya Sanskriti-Swaroop aur Siddhaant, Jaipur, 2003
 Sanskrit Natyavallari (collection of drama), Jaipur, 1999
 Sudheejanvrittam (collection of biographies), Jaipur, 1997 
 Sanskrit ke Yugpurush: Manjunath, Jaipur, 2004
 Jaipur ki Sanskrit Parampara, Jaipur, 2000
 Horizons of Sanskrit, Pub. Rajasthan Sanskrit Akademy, Jaipur, 2016.

He has translated a large number of books, research journals, commemorative volumes, in Sanskrit and Hindi, and also books to and from English, Sanskrit, Prakrit and Rajasthani languages.

He is the chief editor of renowned Sanskrit monthly Bharati.

References

External links
 Kala Nath Shastry
 Encyclopaedia of Indian Literature: Sasay to Zargot 

Scholars from Rajasthan
Rajasthani people
Recipients of the Rashtrapati Award
Living people
1936 births
Recipients of the Sahitya Akademi Award in Sanskrit
Indian Sanskrit scholars
Indian Indologists
Writers from Jaipur
20th-century Indian translators
21st-century Indian translators
20th-century Indian biographers
20th-century Indian poets
21st-century Indian poets